Locke Township may refer to:

 Locke Township, Crawford County, Arkansas, in Crawford County, Arkansas
 Locke Township, Elkhart County, Indiana
 Locke Township, Ingham County, Michigan
 Locke Township, Rowan County, North Carolina

Township name disambiguation pages